The Flesch–Kincaid readability tests are readability tests designed to indicate how difficult a passage in English is to understand. There are two tests: the Flesch Reading-Ease, and the Flesch–Kincaid Grade Level. Although they use the same core measures (word length and sentence length), they have different weighting factors.

The results of the two tests correlate approximately inversely: a text with a comparatively high score on the Reading Ease test should have a lower score on the Grade-Level test. Rudolf Flesch devised the Reading Ease evaluation; somewhat later, he and J. Peter Kincaid developed the Grade Level evaluation for the United States Navy.

History
"The Flesch–Kincaid" (F–K) reading grade level was developed under contract to the U.S. Navy in 1975 by J. Peter Kincaid and his team. Related U.S. Navy research directed by Kincaid delved into high-tech education (for example, the electronic authoring and delivery of technical information), usefulness of the Flesch–Kincaid readability formula, computer aids for editing tests, illustrated formats to teach procedures, and the Computer Readability Editing System (CRES).

The F–K formula was first used by the Army for assessing the difficulty of technical manuals in 1978 and soon after became a United States Military Standard. Pennsylvania was the first U.S. state to require that automobile insurance policies be written at no higher than a ninth-grade level (14–15 years of age) of reading difficulty, as measured by the F–K formula. This is now a common requirement in many other states and for other legal documents such as insurance policies.

Flesch reading ease 

In the Flesch reading-ease test, higher scores indicate material that is easier to read; lower numbers mark passages that are more difficult to read. The formula for the Flesch reading-ease score (FRES) test is:

Scores can be interpreted as shown in the table below.

Reader's Digest magazine has a readability index of about 65, Time magazine scores about 52, an average grade six student's written assignment (age of 12) has a readability index of 60–70 (and a reading grade level of six to seven), and the Harvard Law Review has a general readability score in the low 30s. The highest (easiest) readability score possible is 121.22, but only if every sentence consists of only one one-syllable word. "The cat sat on the mat." scores 116. The score does not have a theoretical lower bound; therefore, it is possible to make the score as low as wanted by arbitrarily including words with many syllables. The sentence "This sentence, taken as a reading passage unto itself, is being used to prove a point." has a readability of 69. The sentence "The Australian platypus is seemingly a hybrid of a mammal and reptilian creature." scores 37.5 as it has 24 syllables and 13 words. While Amazon calculates the text of Moby-Dick as 57.9, one particularly long sentence about sharks in chapter 64 has a readability score of −146.77. One sentence in the beginning of Swann's Way, by Marcel Proust, has a score of −515.1.

The U.S. Department of Defense uses the reading ease test as the standard test of readability for its documents and forms. Florida requires that insurance policies have a Flesch reading ease score of 45 or greater.

Use of this scale is so ubiquitous that it is bundled with popular word processing programs and services such as KWord, IBM Lotus Symphony, Microsoft Office Word, WordPerfect, WordPro, and Grammarly.

Polysyllabic words affect this score significantly more than they do the grade-level score.

Flesch–Kincaid grade level 
These readability tests are used extensively in the field of education. The "Flesch–Kincaid Grade Level Formula" presents a score as a U.S. grade level, making it easier for teachers, parents, librarians, and others to judge the readability level of various books and texts. It can also mean the number of years of education generally required to understand this text, relevant when the formula results in a number greater than 10. The grade level is calculated with the following formula:

The result is a number that corresponds with a U.S. grade level. The sentence, "The Australian platypus is seemingly a hybrid of a mammal and reptilian creature" is an 11.3 as it has 24 syllables and 13 words. The different weighting factors for words per sentence and syllables per word in each scoring system mean that the two schemes are not directly comparable and cannot be converted. The grade level formula emphasizes sentence length over word length. By creating one-word strings with hundreds of random characters, grade levels may be attained that are hundreds of times larger than high school completion in the United States. Due to the formula's construction, the score does not have an upper bound.

The lowest grade level score in theory is −3.40, but there are few real passages in which every sentence consists of a single one-syllable word. Green Eggs and Ham by Dr. Seuss comes close, averaging 5.7 words per sentence and 1.02 syllables per word, with a grade level of −1.3. (Most of the 50 used words are monosyllabic; "anywhere", which occurs eight times, is the only exception.)

Applications

Leah Borovoi from the Infinity Labs has calculated the Flesch score for the seven Harry Potter books that were located at the Glozman Website. The average Flesch score for Harry Potter was 72.83, with the highest score (81.32) for Harry Potter and the Philosopher's Stone and the lowest score (65.88) for Harry Potter and the Order of the Phoenix.

Readability of newspaper content (by topic and by newspaper) has been measured on a big-data scale, showing strong topic-readability correlations.

Leah Borovoi also calculated the Flesch score for 2,000 articles about people on Wikipedia. According to this study, the most readable articles are about sportspeople and entertainers (such as actors and actresses), while the least readable articles are about scientists and philosophers. The least readable scientists are economists (Flesch score = 41.70), psychologists (42.25), chemists (42.81), and mathematicians (43.35).

According to the Flesch score, the most readable Wikipedia articles about people are the articles about sports figures. For example: basketball player Larry Bird (72.60), former Olympic Skater Bonnie Blair (70.43) and basketball player Kareem Abdul-Jabbar (70.11).

Limitations

As readability formulas were developed for school books, they demonstrate weaknesses compared to directly testing usability with typical readers. They neglect between-reader differences and effects of content, layout and retrieval aids. For example, the pangram "Cwm fjord-bank glyphs vext quiz." has a reading ease score of 100 and grade level score of 0.52 despite its obscure words.

See also
 Readability

References

Further reading

External links
 readability.mackayst.com, lists Flesch–Kincaid scores of Project Gutenberg books

Readability tests
1975 introductions

de:Lesbarkeitsindex#Flesch Reading Ease